The Narrows of the Green is a  section of the Green River, in Henderson County and Polk County, between the Big Hungry creek confluence and the Fishtop access area, in western North Carolina, United States.

White water kayaking

The Green Narrows is best known for being one of the most extreme kayaking runs in the Eastern US. This regular flow allows for year-round kayaking and is part of the reason the Green is such a notorious and well known  river.

The three major rapids on the river ("The Big Three") are called "Go Left and Die", "Gorilla" and "Sunshine". Gorilla is considered the most visually impressive rapid on the river. It consists of the river funneling into a -wide slot ("The Notch") and is then immediately followed by an  waterfall ("the flume") and then another  waterfall ("Scream Machine"). Sunshine is considered the most difficult and dangerous rapid, and consists of a  waterfall landing on a jagged rock shelf below. The river gets considerably more difficult at higher water levels, however the Green has been run at up to 300% flows (over 30" on the stick gauge).

On the first Saturday of November many of the best paddlers in the world descend on the Green to participate in the annual Green Race.  The race is considered by many as the most competitive and coveted whitewater race on the planet.  Since 1996, the staggering amount of video, blog posts, magazine articles, and mega-pixels captured by still cameras at the Green Race can not be estimated, nor can the nervousness of new contestants and the pride of participation.

However, it is only for an unknown reason and historical twist of fate that paddlers still have the Green River to enjoy today, for in 1906 it was nearly dammed in four places (instead of the one dam upstream built around 1921).  The engineers for the four dam concept were Ladshaw and Ladshaw from Spartanburg, SC, and the now annual celebration of man's mysterious failure to advance is called "Ladshaw Day".  At Ladshaw Day parties across the southeast, paddlers make the toast with no small amount of irony, humor, and gratitude:  "To Ladshaw!".

External links
American Whitewater's Green Narrows Page
The Green Race Information Page
The Origins of Ladshaw Day

Rapids of the United States
Bodies of water of North Carolina
Landforms of Henderson County, North Carolina
Landforms of Polk County, North Carolina